The Schmitz Park Bridge is a  concrete-box bridge that spans a ravine in Seattle's Schmitz Park. Built in 1936, the structure is both listed in the National Register of Historic Places and is a designated city landmark.

The bridge was designed by city engineer Clark Eldridge. It replaced a timber-truss span that had been erected in 1916. The funds were provided by the federal Public Works Administration and by local gas-tax and highway funds. The rigid frame created by the concrete box cells made the structure 60 percent longer than any such bridge previously constructed.

The graffiti artwork underneath the bridge has received praise in C-Monster's art blog and from a critic with the Seattle Post-Intelligencer.

References

Art Deco architecture in Washington (state)
Bridges in Seattle
Bridges completed in 1936
Road bridges on the National Register of Historic Places in Washington (state)
National Register of Historic Places in Seattle
1936 establishments in Washington (state)
Concrete bridges in the United States